The Iron Curtain Trail (ICT), also known as EuroVelo 13 (EV13), is a partially complete long-distance cycling route which will run along the entire length of the former Iron Curtain. During the period of the Cold War (c. 1947-1991), the Iron Curtain delineated the border between the Communist East and the capitalist West, with the East being the Warsaw Pact countries of the Soviet bloc and the West being the countries of NATO.

The ICT can also be walked as a long-distance trail.

Overview
, many parts of the ICT are already complete, particularly in the central section, such as most of the German part and along the Czech border.

The Iron Curtain Trail, which is closely related to the European Green Belt project, is being managed as three projects:
 The central section passes straight through Germany, following the old border between East Germany and West Germany.
 The southern part travels  along the borders of Croatia, Serbia, Romania, Bulgaria, Macedonia, Greece and Turkey to the Black Sea

Development
20 countries are part of the Iron Curtain Trail project, among them are 14 members of the European Union.

The ICT was lobbied for by the efforts of German Green Party politician Michael Cramer MEP. Trails have been created and made better suited to cycling with help and finance from the European Union, with historical signposts and markers erected.

See also
Iron Curtain
European Green Belt
EuroVelo
German Cycling Network

References

External links
The Iron Curtain Trail - experiencing the history of Europe's division

EuroVelo
Hiking trails in Europe
Cycleways in Norway
Cycleways in Finland
Cycleways in Russia
Cycleways in Estonia
Cycleways in Latvia
Cycleways in Lithuania
Cycleways in Poland
Cycleways in Germany
Cycleways in the Czech Republic
Cycleways in Austria
Cycleways in Slovakia
Cycleways in Hungary
Cycleways in Slovenia
Cycleways in Croatia
Cycleways in Serbia
Cycleways in Romania
Cycleways in Bulgaria
Cycleways in North Macedonia
Cycleways in Greece
Cycleways in Turkey